La Unión, Honduras may refer to:

 La Unión, Atlántida - a village in the department of Atlántida in Honduras
 La Unión, Copán - a municipality in the department of Copán in Honduras
 La Unión, Lempira - a municipality in the department of Lempira in Honduras
 La Unión, Olancho - a municipality in the department of Olancho in Honduras

See also
La Unión (disambiguation)